Super Typhoon Violet was a super typhoon that hit Japan in October 1961.

Meteorological history 

Violet was first observed as a small circulation to the southwest of Marcus Island. On October 2, the system had organized enough to warrant further investigation. After a few days of observation, a report of tropical storm force winds was relayed back to the JTWC and on October 4, it was upgraded to Tropical Storm Violet. Violet took an unusual track, moving in a southern direction after formation. This was due to its location west of a high-pressure system, which the storm struggled to move around. After completing a curve to the south of the ridge, Violet quickly intensified into a typhoon. The movement of the subtropical ridge to the east resulted in Violet turning abruptly to the northwest. Violet moved in a smooth path northward and clipped the Boso Peninsula area of Japan, near Tokyo. After landfall, Violet began to transition into an extratropical cyclone and continued to move northward. By October 10, Violet had become fully extratropical.

Impact 

Violet was an intense storm, yet did not impact any landmass at or near peak intensity. On Guam, damages were light, mostly consisting of crop damage. The effects on Japan were generally minimal due in part to early preparation. A 9124-ton freighter, The Pioneer Muse, was left stranded on the Daitō Islands during the passing of the typhoon on October 9. All men on board were saved and later the cargo of military hardware was scavenged. Another ship, The Sheik, also was stranded a few miles from The Pioneer Muse, it would later break in two due to rough seas. Two fatalities were reported in Japan due to the passage of Violet.

See also 

 Typhoon Ruth (1962)
 Typhoon Hagibis

External links 

 Digital Typhoon : Typhoon 196124 (VIOLET)  - デジタル台風

References 

Typhoons in Japan
1961 in Japan
1961 Pacific typhoon season